The Military Commissions Act of 2006 mandated that rulings from the Guantanamo military commissions could be appealed to a Court of Military Commission Review, which would sit in Washington D.C.

In the event, the Review Court was not ready when it was first needed.  Peter Brownback and Keith J. Allred, the officers appointed to serve as Presiding Officers in the Military Commissions that charged Omar Khadr and Salim Ahmed Hamdan dismissed the charges against the two men because the Military Commissions Act only authorized the commissions to try "unlawful enemy combatants".
Khadr and Hamdan, like 570 other Guantanamo captives had merely been confirmed to be "enemy combatants".

The Court of Military Commission Review ruled that Presiding Officers were, themselves, authorized to rule whether suspects were "illegal enemy combatant".

Judges

To be eligible for a seat on the Court of Military Commission Review, candidates must currently be serving as a judge on either the Army Court of Criminal Appeals, the Air Force Court of Criminal Appeals, the Navy-Marine Corps Court of Criminal Appeals, or be nominated by the President of the United States. In 2016, all judges on the court began receiving presidential appointments with Senate confirmations.

Julie Huygen (2019) and Luis O. Rodriguez (2020) have also been confirmed by the Senate as judges of USCMCR, but have not assumed their positions.

United States v. Mohammed Jawad

Stephen R. Henley the Presiding Officer in United States v. Mohamed Jawad had ruled that evidence that was the result of torture could not be used.
On February 9, 2009, three judges from the Court, Frank J. Williams, Dan O'Toole, and D. Francis were empaneled to consider whether they should comply with the President's Executive Order halting all their proceedings.

Suspension

On January 22, 2009, President Obama issued Executive Order 13492 ordering the closure of the Guantanamo Bay detention camps, within one year.  
That order temporarily suspended all proceedings before the Court of Military Commission Review.  Congress later blocked the closure of the camp.

Appeal of the verdict of Ali Al Bahlul's military commission

Carol Rosenberg, writing in the Miami Herald, reported that Ali Al Bahlul's military defense attorneys filed a fifty-page appeal of his sentence on free speech grounds on September 2, 2009.
They claimed his production of al Qaeda propaganda material was protected by the first amendment of the United States Constitution.

Three of the Court's judges assembled on January 26, 2010, to hear oral arguments. Following that, the CMCR determined to proceed with the case en banc and held a hearing on March 16, 2011. The CMCR issued an opinion on September 9, 2011, that upheld al Bahlul's conviction.

Salim Hamdan's appeal

Attorneys working on behalf of Salim Hamdan have appealed his conviction, and oral arguments were heard on January 26, 2010.
Hamdan has already finished serving his sentence.

Replacement proposal

Carol Rosenberg, writing in the Miami Herald, reported that the Obama Administration had proposed a change in where appeals of the rulings and verdicts of military commissions would be heard.  
The proposed changes would have had them first heard by the United States Court of Appeals for the Armed Forces, which Rosenberg noted was an experienced, respected 58-year-old institution.  Under the current rules of the court, there is no appeal to rulings of the Court of Military Commission Review; under the proposed changes, appeals could ultimately have been taken to the United States Supreme Court.

References 

τ
Guantanamo Bay captives legal and administrative procedures
United States military courts
2006 establishments in the United States
Courts and tribunals established in 2006